Dara Kovačević, (Serbian Cyrillic: Дaрa Ковачевић; born March 13, 1983, in Bačka Palanka, SFR Yugoslavia) is a former Serbian basketball player.

External links
Profile at eurobasket.com

1983 births
Living people
People from Bačka Palanka
Serbian women's basketball players
Centers (basketball)
ŽKK Vršac players